C. foliatus may refer to:
 Catopsalis foliatus, an extinct mammal species from the Paleocene of North America
 Culex foliatus, Brug, 1932, a species in the genus Culex found in South-East Asia
 Cupiennius foliatus, F. O. P.-Cambridge, 1901, a spider species found in Costa Rica and Panama

See also
 Foliatus (disambiguation)